Charlotte Zwerin (born Charlotte Mitchell, August 15, 1931January 22, 2004) was an American documentary film director and editor known for her work concerning artists and musicians. However, she is most known for her editing contributions to the direct cinema and cinéma vérité documentaries Salesman (1969), Gimme Shelter (1970), and Running Fence (1978) in which she was given co-director credits along with the two cinéma vérité pioneers Albert and David Maysles.

Biography 
Zwerin grew up in Detroit, Michigan. She studied at Wayne State University and established a film club there which sparked her interest in documentary filmmaking. After this, she moved to New York City and found a job with Drew Associates, who were pioneers of direct cinema in the United States. Here, she met and began to work with Albert and David Maysles. Zwerin went on to edit and co-direct two of the canonical cinéma vérité documentaries with the Maysles brothers: Salesman and Gimme Shelter. Zwerin died of lung cancer in January 2004 at her home in Manhattan, at the age of 72.

Career 
Zwerin was an editor who worked on some of the canonical films of the cinéma vérité mode of documentary filmmaking including Salesman and Gimme Shelter. Salesman is concerned with following door-to-door Bible salesmen as they attempt to sell the greatest "best seller in the world." Gimme Shelter monitors the famous London rock band, The Rolling Stones, during their 1969 tour which culminated in the deadly Altamont Free Concert. The film has gained a great deal of notoriety, infamy and controversy for portraying a stabbing which resulted in the death of Meredith Hunter at the hands of the Hell's Angels, who were working as security for the concert.

Zwerin directed several other documentaries with subjects such as Thelonious Monk, "the brilliant and eccentric jazz pianist," the Armenian abstract painter Arshile Gorky, and the legendary singer Ella Fitzgerald, among many others. Her last editing project was as story consultant on the 2003 documentary film West 47th Street.

Zwerin's work is often described as following the French documentary style of representation known as cinéma vérité. Her work is also emblematic of the direct cinema style.

Filmography 
 Salesman (1969)
 Gimme Shelter (1970)
 Running Fence (1978)
 De Kooning on de Kooning (1981)
 Islands (1987)
 Horowitz Plays Mozart (1987)
 Thelonious Monk: Straight, No Chaser (1989)
 Music for the Movies: Toru Takemitsu (1994)
 Sculpture of Spaces: Noguchi (1995)
 Ella Fitzgerald: Something to Live For (1999)

References

External links 

1931 births
2004 deaths
American documentary film directors
Artists from Detroit
Deaths from lung cancer in New York (state)
Wayne State University alumni
American women documentary filmmakers